Leoni is an Italian surname, literally meaning "lions". Notable people with this surname include:

People 
Pier Leoni (died 1128), son of the Jewish convert Leo de Benedicto and founder of the Roman family of the Pierleoni
Jacob Jehudah Leoni (1603-1675), Jewish Dutch scholar, translator of the Psalms, and expert on heraldry, of Sephardic descent
Adolfo Leoni (1917—1970), Italian professional road bicycle racer
Anilza Leoni (1933–2009), Brazilian actress, singer, ballerina and painter, of Italian descent
Atossa Leoni (born 1977), German actress
Bruno Leoni (1913–1967), Italian political philosopher (classical liberalism) and lawyer
Carlo Leoni (historian) (1812–1872), Italian historian and epigraphist
 Carlos Leoni, founder and former member of the Brazilian pop-rock band Kid Abelha
Carlo Leoni (politician) (born 1955), Italian politician
David Leoni (born 1982), English Olympic Games biathlete
Demetris Leoni (born 1977), Cypriot retired goalkeeper and goalkeeping coach 
Dindigul I. Leoni (born 1954), Indian school teacher, orator, social debates anchor
Domenico Leoni, magister militum of Venice in 737, of Byzantine origin
Elio Leoni Sceti (born 1966),  Italian businessman and an investor in early-stage companies
Endrio Leoni (born 1968), Italian road bicycle racer
Ezio Leoni (1927-2015), "Maestro", Italian composer, arranger, orchestra conductor, producer and A&R Executive
Franco Leoni (1864–1949), Italian opera composer (L'Oracolo)
Frank Leoni (born 1968), American college baseball coach
Giacomo Leoni (1686–1746), Italian architect, also known as James Leoni
Gianni Leoni, Italian motorcycle racer
Giorgio Leoni (born 1950), Sammarinese professional football manager
Giovanni Antonio Leoni (17th century), Roman violinist and composer .
Guido Leoni (1915-1951), Italian Grand Prix motorcycle road racer
Guglielmo da Leoni (1664–c. 1740), Italian painter and engraver
Johnny Leoni (born 1984), Swiss goalkeeper football player
Lamberto Leoni (born 1953), former racing driver from Italy
Leone Leoni (1509–1590), Italian Renaissance sculptor and medallist (or his son Pompeo) 
Leone Leoni (composer) (c. 1560 – 1627), Italian composer and Maestro di cappella
Lodovico Leoni (1531–1606), Italian painter, mainly active in Rome
Matheus Leoni (born 1991), Brazilian defender football player
Michael Leoni, (c. 1750–1797) stage name of Myer Lyon, English-German-Jewish tenor singer
Lodovico Leoni (1531–1606), Italian painter, father of 
Ottavio Leoni (1578–1630), Italian painter, son of Lodovico
Nestore Leoni (1862–1947), Italian painter and illuminator of manuscripts (miniatore)
Paolo Leoni (died 1590), Roman Catholic Bishop of Ferrara 
Pier Leoni, Medieval Roman consul
Pietro Leoni (1909–1995), Jesuit priest from Italy who later worked in the Soviet Union
Pietro Leoni (bishop) (1637–1697). Roman Catholic Bishop of Ceneda (1667–1691) and Bishop of Verona 
Raúl Leoni (1905–1972), President of Venezuela from 1964 until 1969, of Italian descent
Roberto Leoni, Italian screenwriter and film director 
Stéphane Léoni (born 1976), French former footballer
Téa Leoni (born 1966), American actress of Italian descent
Tommaso Leoni (born 1991), Italian snowboarder, specializing in snowboard cross

See also 

Leoni Jansen, Dutch singer and stage-director
Leoni Franco (born 1942), Uruguayan musician, composer, and guitarist
 Leone (disambiguation)

Italian-language surnames